B57 or B-57 may refer to:
 BMW B57, a turbo-diesel straight-six engine, produced by BMW since 2015
 Bundesstraße 57, a German road
 B57 (New York City bus) in Brooklyn
 B57 nuclear bomb
 B-57 Canberra, a US-built version of the English Electric Canberra bomber 
 Volvo B57, a bus
 Sicilian Defence in the Encyclopaedia of Chess Openings
 HLA-B57, an HLA-B serotype